Ashton Gate is a stadium in Ashton Gate, Bristol, England, and is the home of Bristol City and the Bristol Bears. Located in the south-west of the city, just south of the River Avon, it currently has an all-seated capacity of 27,000.

History and arrangement 
Ashton Gate was the home of Bedminster until their 1900 merger with Bristol South End who played at St John's Lane, and the merged club played at St John's Lane until the end of the 1903–04 season, when they moved to Ashton Gate.

The ground has also played a part in the history of rugby in the city. Bristol played there on a number of occasions since the 1920s, one occasion being on 27 December 2006 when they defeated local rivals Bath Rugby 16–6 whilst selling out the stadium for an all-time record Premiership crowd outside of Twickenham.  Several rugby internationals have been held, starting with England versus Wales in 1899.  100 years later, the All Blacks took on Tonga in a Rugby World Cup pool match. As of the 2014–2015 season, Bristol Rugby permanently moved to Ashton Gate.

It has hosted three England under-21 international friendlies. The first was against Italy on the 12th February 1997 with Darren Eadie scoring the winner in a 1-0 win in front of a crowd of 13,850.     The second  was against Romania's under-21s on 21 August 2007. It ended in a 1–1 draw with Matt Derbyshire giving the hosts the lead on the eighth minute but Joe Hart's 25th minute own goal gifted the visitors a draw but they had Cristian Scutaru sent off on the seventy second minute for a second bookable offence. There were 18,640 in attendance. The third was against Uzbekistan's under-21s on 10 August 2010. The hosts beat the visitors 2–0 with Danny Rose scoring on the 64th minute and Martin Kelly scoring on the 78th minute. There were 9,821 in attendance. It also hosted the 2021 National League play-off Final after it was moved from Wembley Stadium to avoid clashes with UEFA Euro 2020 matches.

Current stands 

Lansdown Stand

The West Stand was completed in time for the start of the 2016–17 season and renamed The Lansdown Stand in honour of the majority shareholder, Stephen Lansdown, who funded the Ashton Gate redevelopment. The stand marked the completion of the redevelopment of Ashton Gate. It is the largest in the stadium, with a capacity of 11,000. It has two tiers and is equipped with multiple executive boxes. The roof is covered in solar panels to provide a renewable energy source to power the entire stadium. The stand houses the tunnel, team benches, and beneath the stand are the changing rooms and offices. Three blocks of the upper tier of the Lansdown stand are designated as a family area for football matches, and one block of the lower tier is designated as the family area for rugby matches.

Dolman Stand

The Dolman Stand, which lies opposite the Lansdown Stand, was built in 1970, making it the oldest stand at Ashton Gate. At that time it was built it had a small, flat Family Enclosure in front of it, which was later built up and converted to seating. In the summer of 2007, the original wooden seats in the upper area were replaced by modern plastic seats. It is named after the former club chairman and president Harry Dolman. This stand was redeveloped over the summer of 2015 as part of the redevelopment of Ashton Gate and has a capacity of around 6,200.

Atyeo Stand

The Atyeo stand is the smallest in the stadium with a capacity of around 4,200. It was built in 1994 to replace an open terrace and still contains the old dressing rooms and a large gymnasium. It is named after Bristol City legend John Atyeo, who played 645 times for City and scored 351 goals, making him the club's top goalscorer ever. He died in 1993, a year before the new stand opened. After the demolition of the Wedlock Stand, the north-east section of this stand was used to house the away fans. After construction of the Lansdown Stand, away fans were situated in the western three-quarters of the Atyeo stand. The whole stand was made available for away fans from the 2017/18 season onwards and is closed for rugby matches.

South Stand

The South Stand was completed just after the end of the 2014–15 season as part of the redevelopment of Ashton Gate. It has a capacity of 6,071. Unlike the other stands at Ashton Gate, it is not named after a person who had strong ties with the club. The stand is linked to the neighbouring Dolman and Lansdown stands via a concourse.

Former stands 
Wedlock "East End" Stand

The old East End was demolished during the summer of 2014 and has been completely rebuilt to modern standards. It was built as a covered terrace in 1928, converted to seats in the 1990s and was the traditional home fans' end until 1994. It was known as the East End to City fans.

Williams Stand

The Williams Stand was on the southwest side, which included the directors' box and press box, and was built in 1958. The lower part of the stand was a terrace known as the Grand Enclosure until it was converted to seating in the 1990s. This stand was also named after a former chairman Des Williams.  Demolition of this stand occurred in June 2015 in preparation for rebuilding to modern standards over the course of the next year.

Redevelopment of Ashton Gate 
Following extensive planning and the failed bid to develop a new ground at Ashton Vale, and criticism of the failure of so many major leisure and sporting projects in Bristol, Bristol City finally decided to press ahead with a major redevelopment of the current site at Ashton Gate. This was approved in late 2013, with final clearance given in spring 2014, and work started in May 2014, following the final home fixture of the 2013–14 season.

The plans for redevelopment were as follows:
 Demolition of the existing Williams and Wedlock (East End) stands, to be replaced by new, larger stands, with executive boxes.
 Extension of the existing Dolman stand
 Shifting of the current pitch by 5 metres to enable the Dolman extension, and a new pitch laid to enable shared use with the rugby club
 Other works to the ground to bring it in line with modern stadia, with capacity of around 27,000

The works were completed prior to the start of the 2016–17 season.

Other uses

Rugby Union 
Since August 2014 Ashton Gate has also been the home of Bristol Bears.

Ashton Gate has also held two international rugby union matches, as follows:

In September 2020, it was announced the stadium would host the 2019–20 Heineken Champions Cup final on 17 October, the match was originally scheduled to be held in Marseille but was moved due to the COVID-19 pandemic.

Rugby League 
Ashton Gate has held one rugby league tour match, as follows:

Music 
Ashton Gate has played host to concerts, including those of The Who, The Rolling Stones, Westlife, Bryan Adams, Neil Diamond, Bon Jovi, The Best, Elton John Meat Loaf, Muse, Spice Girls, Take That and The Killers.

See also 

Ground improvements at English football Stadia
Bristol City Stadium

References

External links 

Official Ashton Gate Stadium Website

Bristol City F.C.
Football venues in Bristol
Rugby union stadiums in England
Rugby World Cup stadiums
Music venues in Bristol
English Football League venues
American football venues in England
1887 establishments in England
Sports venues completed in 1887